Igor Escudero Morais (born Leon, 1977) is a Spanish musician, best known as a composer of classical music and opera.
He is the author of eleven operas (including the trilogy based on "I, Claudius", premiered with the Castile and León Symphony Orchestra), three musicals ("The Fall of the House of Usher"' has also been considered chamber opera), three profane oratories ("The mountain of souls", "The glass Cathedral" and "Moonbeam"), concerts, soundtracks for documentaries (four pieces for two documentaries for "The Time Tunnel" of "RTVE"), OST for audiovisuals and short films, sacred and profane choral music, cantatas and a great variety of chamber pieces.

Selected works

Opera 

The legend of Tamonante (2021)
The Commoners (2021)
I, Claudius & Claudius the God(2019)
 Part One: Livia
 Part Two: Caligula
 Part Three: Claudius, the God
Peter I, the Evil (2009)
Oci, the Shaman (2006)

Chamber opera 

Borderland (2022)
Casina(2013)
The third king (2012)

Secular oratorios

The mountain of souls (2020)
The glass Cathedral (2014)
Moonbeam (2011)

Filmography and discography 

The Time Tunnel      (2018)
Adendro (2015)

Musicals

The Fall of the House of Usher (2016)
The Goggólori (2007)
Dragon's head (2006)

Cantatas 
Ego, Rodericus: symphonic legend (2022)
Song of Songs (2015)

Audiovisuals and short films

De hoy al ayer: Una mirada al pasado (2006)
El tiempo del pastor (2006)
La oveja negra (2005)
Lola y las bolas de lana (2005)
La crisis creativa (2004)
Prisioneros (2004)
Un poco como todo (2003)

References

External links
 Official site
 I, Claudius | The opera
 The Fall of the House of Usher

Living people
1977 births
Spanish opera composers
Spanish classical composers
Spanish male classical composers
21st-century Spanish musicians
21st-century male musicians
21st-century classical composers
People from León, Spain